'I Had a Little Nut Tree' is an English language nursery rhyme. It has a Roud Folk Song Index number of 3749.

Lyrics

I had a little nut tree,
Nothing would it bear,
But a silver nutmeg
And a golden pear.

The King of Spain's daughter
Came to visit me,
And all for the sake
Of my little nut tree.

Her dress was made of crimson,
Jet black was her hair,
She asked me for my nutmeg
And my golden pear.

I said, "So fair a princess
Never did I see,
I'll give you all the fruit
From my little nut tree."

Alternative verse:
I skipped over water,
I danced over sea,
And all the birds in the air
Couldn't catch me.

Origins and meaning
The first recorded instance of the rhyme is in Newest Christmas Box, printed in London in 1797. James Orchard Halliwell suggested that it was much older and commemorated Juana of Castile who visited the court of Henry VII in 1506, but did not provide any additional evidence to support the theory.

In popular culture
Roald Dahl parodied the poem in his 1989 book Rhyme Stew.

Notes

Year of song unknown
English children's songs
English folk songs
Songs about trees
Songs about princesses
Songs about Spain
Fictional trees
English nursery rhymes
Traditional children's songs
Songwriter unknown